Smallwood is a civil parish and small village in the unitary authority of Cheshire East and the ceremonial county of Cheshire, England. It is based in a rural area and is largely agricultural. At the 2001 census, the parish had a population of 491, increasing to 614 at the 2011 Census.

There is a primary school (Smallwood Church of England Primary Academy) within the village, and also a children's day nursery attached to a farm. St John's Parish Church, built between 1843 and 1846, is Grade II listed.

A Village Design Statement was created by Smallwood Parish Council, residents of Smallwood and Cheshire East Council. It gives a full description of the village, including its history. In addition it is also a planning document adopted by Cheshire East Council on 14 October 2010.

See also

Listed buildings in Smallwood, Cheshire

References

External links

Villages in Cheshire
Civil parishes in Cheshire